The 2011 North Texas Mean Green football team represented the University of North Texas in the 2011 NCAA Division I FBS football season. The Mean Green were led by first year head coach Dan McCarney and played home games at the new Apogee Stadium in Denton, Texas. They finished the season with five wins and seven losses and went 4-4 against conference opponents to finish in fifth place in the Sun Belt Conference.

Schedule

References

North Texas
North Texas Mean Green football seasons
North Texas Mean Green football